Swim Wales (WASA) (founded 1897 as the Welsh Amateur Swimming Association) is the national governing body of diving, swimming (including open water and synchronised swimming) and water polo, in Wales. It is responsible for establishing the laws of the sport, for organising certification and education programmes for coaches, officials and teachers, and for recreational swimming, aiming to ensure that everybody in Wales has the opportunity to learn to swim.

Swim Wales is structured regionally—with over 90 member clubs and a combined membership of over 9,800 members in the South East Wales, West Wales and North Wales regions—supporting their affiliated swimming, diving, water polo, masters and disabled clubs. It manages the development of competitive swimming sports from starter to international level, and organises competitions, including closed, national and open championships.

Swim Wales is based at the Wales National Pool, Sketty, Swansea.

References 

Wales
Sports governing bodies in Wales
Swimming in Wales
Wales
Organisations based in Swansea
Wales
1897 establishments in Wales
Water polo in Wales